Fred Lethbridge (31 January 1884 – 5 August 1961) was an Australian rules footballer who played with Fitzroy in the Victorian Football League (VFL).

Notes

External links 
		

1884 births
1961 deaths
Australian rules footballers from Melbourne
Fitzroy Football Club players
People from Collingwood, Victoria